Lilium is the plant genus of "true lilies".

Lilium may also refer to:

the Latin term for the fleur-de-lis emblem
Lilium (constellation), a constellation defined by Augustin Royer in 1679
1092 Lilium, a minor planet, discovered in 1924
Lilium (band), a French-American band
Lilium (music), the opening theme song from the anime Elfen Lied
Lilium GmbH, a German start-up developing an electric airplane
Lilium Jet, an electric airplane developed by Lilium
Lilium Tower, a proposed skyscraper project for Warsaw, Poland

See also
Lily (disambiguation)

nl:Lilium